Baddeck, Nova Scotia is a small resort town on Cape Breton Island, Canada. Some of its tourist attractions include:

Alexander Graham Bell National Historic Site - housing a museum dedicated to the work of Alexander Graham Bell
Bell Bay Golf Club - golf course.
Gaelic College of Celtic Arts and Crafts - school of traditional Celtic arts
Gilbert H. Grosvenor Hall - historic former post office, now home to the Bras d'Or Lakes and Watershed Interpretive Centre.
Uisage Ban Falls Provincial Park - park with hiking trails
Cabot Trail - scenic driving route at Baddeck
Kidston Island Lighthouse - historic lighthouse

Tourist attractions in Victoria County, Nova Scotia